Carabus uenoi, is a species of ground beetle in the large genus Carabus.

References 

uenoi
Insects described in 1960